Cantigas de escárnio e maldizer (Portuguese), cantiga de escarnio e maldicir (Galician) or cantigas d'escarnho e de maldizer (Galician-Portuguese), literally "derision and curse songs", are a type of literary composition of insult, mockery and scorn – always with comic intent – from the Middle Ages, typical of the medieval Galician-Portuguese lyric.

The Galician-Portuguese lyrical corpus has approximately 400 texts belonging to the genre. It is often incorrectly characterized as satire, the difference being that this genre normally insults named individuals, unlike the satire, that insults entire classes of people.

The genre often has complex forms, with a variety of personae, and with the rhetoric being roughly in the middle of complexity in comparation to the cantiga de amor and the cantiga de amigo. Insult or mockery are the essence, though techniques have a great variation, such as praising in order to blame, defending in order to accuse, thanking in order to insult. Obscenity is the rule in cantigas de maldizer.

The physical and social world of the time, unlike the two other Galician-Portuguese genres, is very present in the cantigas de escárnio e maldizer, making this genre a great way of studying the social and cultural history of that time.

This genre includes sexual themes, mockery of other troubadours and their songs, social conflicts, legal and political questions, mockery of religion, more specifically of Catholicism, including mockery of the Pope and blasphemies against biblical figures such as Jesus and Mary, mother of Jesus, and parodies of cantigas de amor and cantigas de amigo.

Usually the speaker is a man. The addressed person may be the target of insult, or a  rhetorical "you", serving as an example of a bigger discourse, or a party to the action described or enacted. The rhetorical intent is always to insult. The insulted is usually a person, though in some compositions a class of people is mocked ("infanções") – making such poems a satire and not personal insult –. The background elements are far more varied than compared to the two other genres, and so too is the present situation and action. The techniques in the rhetoric by which the insult is articulated is also highly varied, and this allows a elocutio hardly possible elsewhere.

The origins of the cantigas de escárnio e maldizer are not really known. Henry R. Lang argues that the genre has deep roots in the Iberian Peninsula, though the question is how deep it is. There is no comparably large body of verse in Occitan, Old French, or Italian. One way to find an explanation for this genre is to view it as a continuation of the Roman customs.

See also 
 Galician-Portuguese lyric
 Cantiga de amigo
 Cantiga de amor

References

Notes

Bibliography 
 LANCIANI, Giulia e TAVANI, Giuseppe, As cantigas de escarnio, Edicións Xerais de Galicia, S.A, 1995, p. 106
 TAVANI, Giuseppe, A poesía lírica galego-portuguesa, Galaxia, Vigo, 2ª ed. , 1988, p. 188

Galician-Portuguese
Poetic forms
Western medieval lyric forms